Jackline Mensah (born May 24, 2001) also known as ' TikTok goddess' or ' Lassu'  is a Ghanaian social media personality, comedian, actress and influencer. She gained internet popularity by posting comedic video contents on the mobile-app TikTok, amassing over 2.0 million followers as of 2022.

Early life and education 
Jackline was born in Accra but hails from Volta Region. She had her basic education at Broadwings International School at Spintex, Accra and continued her secondary education in Accra at Presby Senior High School (Presec-Teshie).

TikTok 
Jackline began using TikTok by Mimicking popular American TV series, The Vampire Diaries, and several people and celebrities including Ghanaian dancehall artist, Shatta Wale using a lip-syncing tone.
In September 2021, she became the first Ghanaian verified TikToker to clock one million followers on the popular video-sharing application TikTok.

Film 
Prior to full time acting, she made appearances on Fiifi Coleman's  three-man play show ‘You play me, I play you’ and  Efiewura television series.
Jackline made her on-screen debut with a supporting roles in the 2022 romantic films "The Man We Love" and "Fifty Fifty" directed by Yvonne Nelson .

Awards & Nominations

References

External links
 
 

Ghanaian comedians
Ghanaian women comedians
Ghanaian internet celebrities
Ghanaian actresses
21st-century comedians
21st-century Ghanaian actresses
2001 births

Living people